Wojaczek is a 1999 Polish film  directed by Lech Majewsky and starring Krzysztof Siwczyk in the titular role. It is the biopic of rebellious Polish poet Rafał Wojaczek.
The film's lead actor Krzysztof Siwczyk was nominated for European Film Award for Best Actor.

Synopsis
The film depicts the life of Polish poet Rafał Wojaczek.

Cast
Krzysztof Siwczyk as Rafał Wojaczek
Dominika Ostalowska as Mała

Awards
European Film Award for Best Actor - Krzysztof Siwczyk (nominated)

References

External links

1990s Polish-language films
1999 films
Polish biographical drama films